Alpinacris tumidicauda is a species of grasshopper only known from Otago and Southland, New Zealand. The genus Alpinacris is endemic to the South Island of New Zealand. A. tumidicauda was described in 1967 by Robert Sidney Bigelow, with a type locality of Obelisk in the Old Man Range  A male holotype and paratype are deposited in the Canterbury Museum, Christchurch. Like all of New Zealand sub-alpine and alpine grasshoppers, A. tumidicauda has a 2- or 3-year life cycle. The eggs must "overwinter" before they will hatch. Hoppers are found throughout the year, and adult grasshoppers can be found throughout the New Zealand summer between December and April. The adult A. tumidicauda do not overwinter.

Distribution and habitat
 
Alpinacris tumidicauda is known only from the Otago and Southland regions of New Zealand.

Alpinacris tumidicauda has a "sister species", Alpinacris crassicauda. There would have originally been only one species of Alpinacris in the South Island; however, the Alpine Fault has separated this species over time, so at the present there are two species—A. tumidicauda in southeast of the South Island and A. crassicauda in the northwest of the island.

Species description

Type information
Bigelow, R. S. (1967). The Grasshoppers of New Zealand, Their Taxonomy and Distribution. Christchurch: University of Canterbury
Type locality: Obelisk, Old Man Range, Otago, 
Type specimen: Male; 3 December 1963; R. S. Bigelow. Holotype and paratype are deposited in the Canterbury Museum, Christchurch.

Polymorphism
Four colour morphs are known for adult A. tumidicauda: green, olive, dark olive and yellow-brown. The most common colour morph is green, followed by the yellow-brown colour morph.

References

 

Acrididae of New Zealand
Endemic fauna of New Zealand
Insects described in 1967
Acrididae
Endemic insects of New Zealand